The Wizard of the Strings is a 1985 American short documentary film about Roy Smeck, directed by Peter Friedman. It was nominated for an Academy Award for Best Documentary Short.

Cast
 Roy Smeck as himself

References

External links
The Wizard of the Strings at Strange Attractions
The Wizard of the Strings at Cinema Guild

1985 films
American short documentary films
1980s short documentary films
American independent films
Documentary films about country music and musicians
1985 documentary films
1985 independent films
1980s English-language films
1980s American films